"Dear Friends" is the third television play episode of the first season of the American television series CBS Playhouse. The episode was a two-part installment about a married couple looking at divorce, and the attempts of their friends to try to repair their marriage becoming a look at the relationships that they themselves have.

It aired in December 1967, and was nominated for five Emmy awards, including a win by Paul Bogart for direction.

References

External links 
 
 Academy of Television Arts & Sciences Foundation: Paul Bogart on directing Dear Friends for CBS.

1967 American television episodes
1967 plays
CBS Playhouse episodes